Attorney General Dillon may refer to:

Lucas Dillon (judge) (died 1592), Attorney General for Ireland
Robert Dillon (died 1580), Attorney General for Ireland
Robert Dillon (judge) (1510s–1597), Attorney General for Ireland

See also
General Dillon (disambiguation)